Falero is a surname. Notable people with the surname include:

Abraham Aboab Falero (died 1642), Portuguese philanthropist
Alfonso Falero (born 1959), Spanish japanologist
Emilio Falero (born 1947), Cuban painter
Luis Ricardo Falero (1851–1896), Spanish painter
Nicolás Falero (1921–?), Uruguayan footballer